Blanka Paulů (born March 31, 1954) is a former Czech cross-country skier who competed during the 1970s and 1980s. She won a silver medal in the 4 × 5 km relay at the 1984 Winter Olympics in Sarajevo and finished fourth in the 20 km at those same games.

Paulů also won two medals at the 1974 FIS Nordic World Ski Championships with a silver in the 5 km and a bronze in the 4 × 5 km relay. She also had two individual victories in her career (10 km: 1982, 5 km: 1983).

Cross-country skiing results
All results are sourced from the International Ski Federation (FIS).

Olympic Games
 1 medal – (1 silver)

World Championships
2 medals – (1 silver, 1 bronze)

World Cup

Individual podiums
2 victories
7 podiums

Team podiums
 1 podium

References

External links
 
 World Championship results (as Blanka Paulu) 
 
 
 

1954 births
Living people
Czech female cross-country skiers
Czechoslovak female cross-country skiers
Olympic silver medalists for Czechoslovakia
Cross-country skiers at the 1976 Winter Olympics
Cross-country skiers at the 1980 Winter Olympics
Cross-country skiers at the 1984 Winter Olympics
Olympic medalists in cross-country skiing
FIS Nordic World Ski Championships medalists in cross-country skiing
Medalists at the 1984 Winter Olympics
Universiade medalists in cross-country skiing
Universiade gold medalists for Czechoslovakia
Competitors at the 1975 Winter Universiade
Competitors at the 1978 Winter Universiade
Competitors at the 1981 Winter Universiade
Olympic cross-country skiers of Czechoslovakia
People from Vrchlabí
Sportspeople from the Hradec Králové Region